George Randolph Ketchum (June 25, 1849 – 1927) was a merchant and political figure in New Brunswick, Canada. He represented Carleton County in the Legislative Assembly of New Brunswick from 1886 to 1892 as a Liberal member.

He was born in Upper Woodstock, New Brunswick and was educated there. He married Inez M. Clayton. Ketchum also served on the county council. He operated a general store near Woodstock. Ketchum later moved to Aroostook, Maine.

References 
The Canadian parliamentary companion, 1891, JA Gemmill
Ketchum family business and personal records, University of New Brunswick

1849 births
1927 deaths
New Brunswick Liberal Association MLAs